Sol over Gudhjem, literally "sun over Gudhjem", is a Danish dish, an open sandwich with rugbrød, smoked herring, chives and a raw egg yolk (the "sun") on top. The island of Bornholm, where Gudhjem is situated, is known for its herring smoke-houses (røgerier). Since 2009, the name has also come to be used for a contest between top-rated chefs to create a special meal from local Bornholm products.

See also
 List of sandwiches

References

Danish cuisine
Seafood sandwiches
Open-faced sandwiches
Rye-based dishes